Petro Pavlo Oros (14 July 1917 – 27 August 1953) was a Ruthenian Greek Catholic clandestine hierarch. He was an auxiliary bishop of the Ruthenian Catholic Eparchy of Mukacheve from 1944 to 1953.

Born in Biri, Austria-Hungary Empire (present day – Hungary) in 1917 in the family of the Greek-Catholic priest. He lost a father in age 2 years old and a mother in age 9 years old. He graduated the Theological Seminary in Uzhhorod from 1937 to 1942 and was ordained a priest on 26 June 1942 for the Ruthenian Catholic Eparchy of Mukacheve.  On 19 December 1944 he was clandestinely consecrated to the Episcopate as auxiliary bishop. The principal and single consecrator was blessed bishop Theodore Romzha.

He was shot by Communists in Siltse, Irshava raion, Zakarpattia Oblast after celebration of the clandestine Divine Liturgy on 27 August 1953.

Currently is going process of his beatification and on 5 August 2022 by the Holy See was recognised his martyrdom.

References 

1917 births
1953 deaths
Ukrainian people of Hungarian descent
20th-century Eastern Catholic bishops
Ruthenian Catholic bishops
Servants of God
Venerated Catholics